Mycobacterium virus Jeffabunny is a bacteriophage known to infect bacterial species of the genus Mycobacterium.

Jeffabunny was discovered by Sir Jeffrey Rubin in 2008 in HHMI funded lab as part of SEAPHAGES.

References

Siphoviridae
Mycobacteriophages